Samuel Anthony Mason II (July 21, 1899 – March 7, 1971) was an American football player. 

Mason was born in 1899 in Hampton, Virginia. He attended Episcopal High School and later the Virginia Military Institute (VMI). He played at the end position on the undefeated 1920 VMI Keydets football team that compiled a 9–0 record and became known as the "Flying Squadron". One writer at the time noted: "Mason is one of those men who accomplish difficult things with apparent ease. The very ease with which he stopped plays caused him to be overlooked by some of the so-called experts."

He played college football for VMI and at the fullback position in the National Football League (NFL) for the Minneapolis Marines in 1922 and the Milwaukee Badgers in 1925. He appeared in eight NFL games, six as a starter.

In later years, Mason was involved in horse breeding. He died in 1971 in Richmond, Virginia. He was buried at the Hollywood Cemetery in Richmond. In 1972, he was posthumously inducted into the VMI Hall of Fame as one of its charter members. He was also named as one of two ends on the all-time VMI football team.

References

1899 births
1971 deaths
Minneapolis Marines players
Milwaukee Badgers players
Players of American football from Virginia